Anthony Jullien (born 5 March 1998) is a French former cyclist, who competed as a professional for UCI WorldTeam  for the 2021 and 2022 seasons.

Major results

2018
 5th Paris–Tours Espoirs
2019
 2nd Road race, National Under-23 Road Championships
 2nd Trofeo Gianfranco Bianchin
 4th Ruota d'Oro
 5th Grand Prix des Marbriers
 9th Paris–Tours Espoirs
2020
 5th Paris–Tours Espoirs

References

External links

1998 births
Living people
French male cyclists
People from Givors
Sportspeople from Lyon Metropolis
Cyclists from Auvergne-Rhône-Alpes